Visa requirements for Sri Lankan citizens are administrative entry restrictions by the authorities of other states placed on citizens of Sri Lanka. In 2022, Sri Lankan citizens had visa-free or visa on arrival access to 41 countries and territories, ranking the Sri Lankan passport 103rd in terms of travel freedom (tied with passports from Lebanon and Sudan) according to the Henley Passport Index.

Although Sri Lanka is a middle income country, successive Sri Lankan governments have made little or no efforts to improve the standing of the passport. The Sri Lankan passport continues to rank in the bottom 10% of Henley's Annual Passport Rankings. Considering the extent of the Sri Lankan diaspora, a passport with wider access to the world could contribute to a more competitive and future ready society. Citizens in neighbouring Maldives can travel visa-free to 88 countries, double that of Sri Lanka. Indians can travel visa free to 59 countries. In South Asia, only Bangladesh (40 countries), Nepal (37 countries), Pakistan (31 countries) and Afghanistan (26 countries) have a lower ranking on the visa index than Sri Lanka.

Sri Lanka shares limited connectivity in terms of people to people and business contacts with the ASEAN, a region that it has shared significant historical and cultural relations with. Within the SAARC region, the Sri Lankan state has made little efforts to encourage religious and spiritual tourism with countries such as Nepal and Bhutan.

The policy of the Sri Lankan state with regards to negotiating visa free travel for Sri Lankan citizens continues to remain poorly organised despite numerous pleas made by individuals and civil society groups. What successive Sri Lankan administrations have done is to negotiate visa free travel for Diplomatic and Official Passport holders to numerous countries, effectively developing a two tiered system that benefits the political classes over ordinary citizens. 



Visa requirements map

Visa requirements

Dependent, Disputed, or Restricted territories
Unrecognized or partially recognized countries

Dependent and autonomous territories

Passport validity
Many countries require passport validity of no less than 6 months and one or two blank pages.

General Limitations on passport use

Visitors holding an Israeli passport or any passports showing evidence of travelling to Israel are not allowed to enter some countries due to the Arab League boycott of Israel, some Arab League countries refuse entry to travelers whose passport shows evidence of entry into Israel or hold an unused Israeli visa.

Criminal record
Some countries (for example, Canada and the United States) routinely deny entry to non-citizens who have a criminal record.

Blank passport pages
Many countries require a minimum number of blank pages in the passport being presented, generally one or two pages. Endorsement pages, which often appear after the visa pages, are not counted as being available.

Persona Non Grata
The government of a country can declare a diplomat persona non grata, banning their entry into that country. In non-diplomatic use, the authorities of a country may also declare a foreigner  persona non grata permanently or temporarily, usually because of unlawful activity. Attempts to enter the Gaza strip by sea may attract a 10-year ban on entering Israel.

Fingerprinting
Several countries including Afghanistan, Argentina, Cambodia, China (applies age between 14 and 70), Japan, Malaysia, Saudi Arabia, South Korea, Taiwan and the United States demand all passengers to be fingerprinted on arrival.

Additionally, the United Arab Emirates and Qatar conduct iris scanning on arrival and on visitors that need to apply for a UAE visa.

See also

Visa policy of Sri Lanka
Sri Lankan passport
Foreign relations of Sri Lanka

References and Notes
References

Notes

Sri Lanka
Foreign relations of Sri Lanka